Cochylidia is a genus of moths belonging to the family Tortricidae.

Species
Cochylidia altivaga Diakonoff, 1976
Cochylidia contumescens (Meyrick, 1931)
Cochylidia heydeniana (Herrich-Schaffer, 1851)
Cochylidia implicitana (Wocke, in Herrich-Schffer, 1856)
Cochylidia liui Ying-Hui Sun & H.H. Li, 2012
Cochylidia moguntiana (Rössler, 1864)
Cochylidia multispinalis Ying-Hui Sun & H.H. Li, 2012
Cochylidia oblonga Y.Q. Liu & X.S. Ge, 2012
Cochylidia richteriana (Fischer von Röslerstamm, 1837)
Cochylidia rupicola (Curtis, 1834)
Cochylidia subroseana (Haworth, [1811])

See also
List of Tortricidae genera

References

 , 2005: World catalogue of insects volume 5 Tortricidae.
 , 1956: Cochylidia gen. nov., eine neue Phaloniidae-Gattung, nebst Beschreibung einer neuen Art aus Deutschland (Lep.). Mitteilungen der Münchner Entomologischen Gesellschaft 46: 14–20. Full article: .
 , 2011: Diagnoses and remarks on genera of Tortricidae, 2: Cochylini (Lepidoptera: Tortricidae). Shilap Revista de Lepidopterologia 39 (156): 397–414.
 Sun, Y.; Li, H. 2012: Review of the genus Cochylidia Obraztsov (Lepidoptera: Tortricidae: Cochylini) in China. Zootaxa, 3268: 1-15

External links
tortricidae.com

Cochylini
Tortricidae genera